N. Gopi (Telugu: ఎన్. గోపి; born 25 June 1948) is an eminent Indian poet, literary critic in Telugu and Sahitya Akademi Award recipient. He has also been in the University system as a professor and Dean since 1974, until retiring in 2008. He has also held the post of the Vice Chancellor of Potti Sreeramulu Telugu University, Hyderabad. Gopi's poetry displays nativity and national outlook.

He has published 50 books including 21 poetry collections, 7 essay collections, 3 research works, 5 travelogues, 5 translations, 2 commentaries, 3 column writings, apart from 5 text books for schools and for adult education projects.

His poetry collections have been translated into several languages like Hindi, English, Gujarati, Nepali, Tamil. Malayalam, Marathi, Konkani. Dogri, Maithili, Kannada, Punjabi, Sanskrit, Oriya, Sindhi, Urdu, Assamese, Meitei, Bengali, Bodo, Kashmiri, Santali, Rajasthani, German, Russian and Persian.

His notable works are ‘Kalanni Nidra Ponivvanu’ (I Will Not let Time Sleep 1998); ‘Naneelu’ (The Little Ones 1998) and ‘Jala Geetham’ (Water Song - a long poem 2002).

Early life and education 
Born on 25 June 1948 in Bhongir village of Nalgonda District, Telangana State. After his schooling from Government High School, he chose to join Arts College, Osmania University, Hyderabad, where he did B.A. with Telugu, Sanskrit and Linguistics group and stood with 6th rank, winning Nizam’s Gold Medal. This was followed by M.A. in Telugu, where he topped the University to win Gurajada Appa Rao Gold Medal from Osmania University in 1973. Later he did a P.G. Diploma in Applied Linguistics. Though his recorded name is Nakka Gopal, he is popularly known as N. Gopi in literary field.

Career 
His first job was Project Officer in a Non-formal Project of UNICEF for one year. Later he joined as a Lecturer in the N.B Science College affiliated to Osmania University in 1974. Later he joined the OU in 1981. He became Professor of Telugu in 1990, Chairman Board of Studies in 1992 and Head of the Department in 1994. Later he was appointed as Vice Chancellor of Telugu University (1999-2002). He was the youngest VC in India when he was chosen for the post. In 2001, he also took an additional charge as an acting VC for Dravidian and Kakatiya Universities simultaneously. After completing his term as the VC of Telugu University, he came back to his parent university, where he served as the Dean Faculty of Arts (2004-2006). After retirement in 2008, he served as UGC Emeritus Fellow during 2011-13 and 2015-17 for the second time.

Literary Works 
A prolific writer, Gopi has published 21 poetry collections so far.

Poetry

Travelogues 
 Nenu Chusina Mauritius (1996)
 Naa Cyprus Yaatra (2001)
 America lo Telugu Yaatra (2002)
 England lo 25 Rojulu (2004)
 Germany lo Kavitaa Yaatra (2015)

Literary Criticism 
 Vyasa Navami (1986)
 Gavaaksham (1992)
 Niluvettu Telugu Santhakam Sinare Vyaktitvam (1992)
 Saalochana - Peethikalu (1998)
 Vyaasa Kalasham (2012)
 Vyaasa Jignaasa (2016)
Other than these he wrote four travel books and many Translations

Research 
 Vemana Vaadam  - commentary (1979)
 Prajaakavi Vemana (1980)
 Vemana Padyaalu - Paris Prathi 1730 AD (1990)
 Toli Parishodhakulu (1998)
 Vemana Velugulu - commentary (2012)
Gopi's Ph.D thesis (1978) on ‘Saint Poet Vemana’ is a monumental work and is rated as the best research work among 20 of that kind in Telugu. This book has had 6 reprints till date.

Major Editing 
 Jnanpith Awardee "Dr. C. Narayana Reddy Samagra Sahityam" (Complete Works of CNR) (2001)
 Founder Editor of ‘Telugu Parishodana’, a research quarterly (1987)

Translations (into Telugu) 
 Gnaana Devudu (1985)
 Tanmaya Dhooli (2012)
 Maa Oori Nadi (2016)
 Paagi (2016)
 Vidyapati Pranaya Geetaalu (2016)

Other Writings 
 Telugu Vaachakam - text book (1982)
 Prayojana Vaachakam - adult literacy (1983)
 Akshara Yaanam - column in India Today (2005)

Father of Naneelu 
Gopi's sixth poetry collection ‘Naneelu’ (1998) (Epigrams like Hykus), means ‘The Little Ones’. This is a poetic form invented by N.Gopi, widely discussed and followed by hundreds of poets. Nearly 300 Nanee collections have been published adopting this form, making this 19 year old form a trend setter in Telugu literature. Gopi’s Naneelu have been translated into 12 languages, including Russian.

Awards and honours 
Courtesy of his literary work and his service to Telugu literature, Gopi is a recipient of more than 30 awards. The following are some of his most recognized awards:
 Sahitya Akademi Award in 2000 for his poetry collection, ‘Kaalanni Nidra Ponivvanu’ (I Will Not Let Time Sleep)
 Freeverse Front award in 1980 for his poetry collection, ‘Mylurayi’ (Milestone)
 Telugu University Award (1991)
 Delhi Telugu Akademi Award (1999)
 Award for outstanding service to literature and culture by Sri Annamacharya Project of North America, Chicago (SAPMA), USA (2001), and ‘Kala Ratna’ award by Govt. of Andhra Pradesh (2009)
Gopi has also served as an elected member of various literary bodies across India. Some of the most coveted positions include:
 Member of A.P. state Sahitya Akademi (1984)
 Telugu Advisory Board member, Sahitya akademi, New Delhi (2002–03)
 Telugu Advisory Board member, National Book Trust of India, New Delhi (2006 onwards)
 Jury Member, Feature Films, Nandi Awards Committee A.P. Govt. (1996)
 Chairman, Jury, T.V. Nandi Awards Committee, A.P. Govt. (2011)
 Convener, Telugu Advisory Board and Member, Executive Council, Central Sahitya Akademi (2013 onwards)

Reception and influence 
Gopi's literary essays are considered original and are widely quoted. His commentaries to Vemana’s poems are considered comprehensive and modern. His prolific columns in various newspapers and magazines on subjects such as literature and current affairs were very well received. He is an orator and much sought after Personality among Telugu Literary and cultural Organizations.

Gopi's extensive work on Vemana's poetry and his large poetry collection have been the subjects of various academic research.

Research on Gopi’s works 
So far, 5 Ph.Ds and 4 M.Phils have been awarded in various universities for research work on Gopi's literature.

Books on Gopi’s works 
 Gopi Kavithanusheelana - Articles by various critics (1998)
 Gopi Kavithanusheelana by Dr. Dwana Sastry (2001)
 Gopi Sahitya Vivechana - Collection of Essays by different scholars edited by Dr. S. Raghu (2010)   
 Jala Deepika - Essays on Gopi’s Jala geetham, Edited by N. Aruna (2008)

Translations of Gopi’s poetry

See also 
 Naneelu
 N.Gopi's poetry is available to read online at https://www.kahaniya.com/ca6049608cfee0ed2e88c0822ceadc

References 

Telugu writers
Telugu poets
Recipients of the Sahitya Akademi Award in Telugu
Recipients of the Kala Ratna
Indian male poets
Academic staff of Osmania University
1950 births
Living people